Marwan Obaidat (born March 25, 1989) is a Jordanian football player who plays as a forward for Al-Ramtha.

References

External links 

Jordanian footballers
Association football forwards
1989 births
Living people
Al-Ramtha SC players
Kufrsoum SC players
Al-Sareeh SC players